Gijsbertus "Gijs" Steinmann (born 2 April 1961) is a Dutch former professional footballer who played as a defender.

Career
Steinmann played club football for AZ, Den Bosch, Utrecht and Go Ahead Eagles in the Eredivisie. During his career he was known for his outspoken nature, and had conflicts with managers.

Steinmann ended his career after the 1995–96 season at Go Ahead Eagles, after he had been demoted from the first team by head coach Ab Fafié. He had earlier called former head coach Henk ten Cate a "liar", and had been deemed a source of friction in the squad.

After his retirement, Steinmann started working for a company specialising in coffee and snack machines, and he lives in Houten.

References

1961 births
Living people
Dutch footballers
AZ Alkmaar players
FC Utrecht players
FC Den Bosch players
Dundee United F.C. players
Heracles Almelo players
Go Ahead Eagles players
Footballers from Utrecht (city)
Scottish Football League players
Eredivisie players
Eerste Divisie players
Association football defenders